The San Juan River Bridge at Shiprock, about  southwest of Shiprock, New Mexico, is a Parker through truss bridge built in 1937.  It was listed on the National Register of Historic Places in 1997.

It is a six-span Parker through truss steel bridge fabricated by W.E. Bondurant.  It brought U.S. Highway 64 and U.S. Route 666 over a broad floodplain of the San Juan River.

From the late 1950s on, when a parallel steel beam bridge was built adjacent to it, it has carried westbound traffic.

References

Bridges in New Mexico
National Register of Historic Places in San Juan County, New Mexico
Buildings and structures completed in 1937